Donald E. Williams Jr. (born February 24, 1973) is a former American professional basketball player.

Amateur career
Born in Raleigh, North Carolina, where he also spent his childhood, Williams played for Garner High School in Garner, North Carolina under coach Eddie Gray before going on to play at the University of North Carolina at Chapel Hill for the late coach Dean Smith.

The 6'3" tall point guard-shooting guard from the University of North Carolina was the recipient of the NCAA basketball tournament Most Outstanding Player Award when North Carolina won the 1993 NCAA National Championship.  In the final game against the University of Michigan, Williams scored 25 points, hitting five of his seven 3-point attempts.

Professional career
After college, Williams led a successful career playing professionally in Cyprus, Germany, Austria, Poland, France, Sweden, Finland, Greece and the Philippines, where he won a championship in 1998 as a player for Formula Shell, coached by Perry Ronquillo, and the Dominican Republic.

Coaching career
Williams is currently the head women's basketball coach at Wakefield High School and the founder and operator of the Donald Williams Basketball Academy.  Williams was named coach of the year during the '17-'18 season and during the '18-'19. Under the leadership of Williams, the Wakefield ladies' basketball team went to the final two conference during the '17-'18 season and won the state championship, while remaining undefeated, during the '18-'19 season.

References

External links
French League profile

1973 births
Living people
AEL Limassol B.C. players
African-American basketball players
American expatriate basketball people in Austria
American expatriate basketball people in Cyprus
American expatriate basketball people in France
American expatriate basketball people in Germany
American expatriate basketball people in Greece
American expatriate basketball people in Israel
American expatriate basketball people in the Philippines
American men's basketball players
Basketball players from North Carolina
Besançon BCD players
Garner Magnet High School alumni
Harlem Globetrotters players
Limoges CSP players
McDonald's High School All-Americans
North Carolina Tar Heels men's basketball players
Parade High School All-Americans (boys' basketball)
People from Garner, North Carolina
Philippine Basketball Association imports
Point guards
Richmond Rhythm players
Shooting guards
Sioux Falls Skyforce (CBA) players
Sporting basketball players
Universiade gold medalists for the United States
Universiade medalists in basketball
Medalists at the 1993 Summer Universiade
Shell Turbo Chargers players
21st-century African-American sportspeople
20th-century African-American sportspeople